Sing-Songs is the second EP by the Australian psychedelic rock band The Church, released in December 1982.

Unlike its polished predecessors, the material was quickly written and recorded as a demo for the band's U.S. label Capitol Records, who had rejected their previous album, The Blurred Crusade, as too uncommercial. Capitol remained unimpressed and dropped the band, but the recordings were released in Australia by EMI/Parlophone.

Sing-songs was long considered the most difficult item in The Church's catalogue to obtain as it was only released as a fairly limited vinyl pressing.

In 2001, EMI Australia released the compilation album Sing-Songs//Remote Luxury//Persia, which contained remastered versions of all the tracks from the EP in their original running order.

Track listing
 "A Different Man" (Kilbey)
 "Ancient History" (Kilbey)
 "The Night is Very Soft" (Kilbey/R. Kilbey)
 "In This Room" (Kilbey)
 "I Am a Rock" (Simon)

Personnel
Steve Kilbey - bass, lead vocals, keyboards, bells
Peter Koppes - lead and slide guitars, backing vocals
Marty Willson-Piper - 12- and 6- string rhythm guitars, backing vocals
Richard Ploog - drums

1982 EPs
The Church (band) albums